Aoife Josee Patarot-Hinds (born 1991) is an actress. She is known for her roles in the BBC Three and Hulu miniseries Normal People (2020), the ITV series The Long Call (2021), and the film Hellraiser.

Early life
Hinds was born in South London to Northern Irish actor Ciarán Hinds and French-Vietnamese actress Hélène Patarot. She took weekend violin and piano lessons at the Guildhall School of Music and Drama. She moved to Paris at the age of 10. She graduated with a Bachelor of Science in International Relations from the London School of Economics (LSE) in 2013. She went on to graduate from the Royal Welsh College of Music & Drama in 2016 with a Master of Arts in Acting. She also trained at the Conservatoire national supérieur d'art dramatique (CNSAD) in 2017.

Career
In 2018, Hinds made her feature film debut in The Commuter and her television debut in the French miniseries Immortality and with a guest appearance in an episode of the Syfy adaptation of Nightflyers. The following year, she played Ellie in the ITV series Cheat and Lyla in the science fiction series The Feed, and gained prominence through her guest role as Mae Chung in an episode of the Channel 4 sitcom Derry Girls. She starred in i will still be whole (when you rip me in half) at the Bunker Theatre.

Hinds had a recurring role as Helen Brophy, Connell's (Paul Mescal) university girlfriend, in the 2020 BBC Three and Hulu miniseries adaptation of Sally Rooney's Normal People. She also appeared in the film The Man in the Hat. In 2021, Hinds portrayed Princess Mary Tudor in the Channel 5 series Anne Boleyn and was in the main cast of the ITV crime drama The Long Call as Gaby Chadwell.

In 2022, Hinds starred in the eleventh installment of the Hellraiser horror franchise, which was released on Hulu. She was in the original cast of the play Patriots at the Almeida Theatre and will make her West End debut when the production transfers to the Noël Coward Theatre. She also presented a television documentary titled The Brontës: An Irish Tale.

Hinds has upcoming roles in the films Cottontail and Scoop, as well as the HBO Max series Dune: The Sisterhood.

Film

Film

Television

Stage

References

External links
 Aoife Hinds at Spotlight

Living people
1991 births
Alumni of the London School of Economics
Alumni of the Royal Welsh College of Music & Drama
Actresses from London
Actresses from Paris
British actresses of Asian descent
British people of French descent
British people of Vietnamese descent
English people of Northern Ireland descent
French people of Irish descent
French people of Vietnamese descent
Irish people of French descent
Irish people of Vietnamese descent
People from the London Borough of Lambeth